The Royal Society of Medicine (RSM) is a medical society in the United Kingdom, headquartered in London.

History 
The Society was established in 1805 as Medical and Chirurgical Society of London, meeting in two rooms in barristers’ chambers at Gray's Inn and then moving to Lincoln's Inn Fields where it stayed for 25 years. In 1834 the Society moved to Berners Street and was granted a Royal Charter by King William IV.

In 1889 under the leadership of Sir John MacAlister, a Building Committee chaired by Timothy Holmes supervised the move of the quarters of the Society from Berners Street to 20 Hanover Square. In 1905 an eleven-member committee headed by Sir Richard Douglas Powell organised the celebration of the Society's centenary. Two years later the Royal Medical and Chirurgical Society of London came together with seventeen specialist medical societies and, with a supplementary Royal Charter granted by Edward VII, became the Royal Society of Medicine.

In 1910 the Society acquired the site on the corner of Wimpole Street and Henrietta Place, which was opened by King George V and Queen Mary in May 1912.

Governance
The Council is the governing body of the Society and is responsible for setting the overall strategic direction of the RSM. Council members are the Society's Trustees. The Council is chaired by the President, who has a three-year term of office.

There are four Standing Committees (Education, Audit and Risk, Finance and Investment, Remuneration, People and Culture).

The Chief Executive is responsible for the day-to-day management and leads the Senior Management Team, comprising the Directors and the Dean of Education. Each Director has their own specific responsibilities.

Presidents

Recent presidents of the society have been:

Previous presidents of note of the former Royal Medical and Chirurgical Society of London were:
 Frederick William Pavy (1900)
 Sir James Paget (1875)
 Joseph Hodgson (1851)
 Thomas Addison (1849)
 Richard Bright (1837)
 William Saunders (1805 (1st))

Membership

The RSM has a global network of 20,000 members.

Fellowship of the RSM is open to those who hold a UK recognised medical, dental or veterinary qualification, or a higher scientific qualification in a healthcare related field. Associate membership is open to those who do not qualify for Fellowship but who work within the healthcare sector or have an interest in healthcare issues. The Society also welcomes student members of medicine, dentistry and veterinary science as members plus other healthcare students. In addition there are up to one hundred Honorary Fellows, drawn from internationally distinguished members of the medical profession and branches of science and allied humanities, who are awarded this honour by Council.

Famous Honorary Fellows (of the Royal Medical and Chirurgical Society of London) include:
 Charles Darwin
 Louis Pasteur
 Edward Jenner
 Sigmund Freud
 Carl Jung

Sections 
The RSM has 55 Sections and Societies that cover all the major specialties and topics of interest in medicine and healthcare. Together the Section Councils are responsible for planning the majority of the RSM’s education programme. Each Section is led by a Section President, and supported by its respective Section Council, which members may apply to join.

Journal of the Royal Society of Medicine
The Royal Society of Medicine’s two journals, the Journal of the Royal Society of Medicine (JRSM) and JRSM Open, are outlets for scholarly comment and clinical research in the specialties of medicine and surgery.  

Published by SAGE Publishing, the journals are editorially independent from the Royal Society of Medicine, and their editor is Dr Kamran Abbasi.JRSM Open is an online-only journal that follows the open-access publishing model. A companion to JRSM, the journal publishes research papers, research letters, clinical reviews and case reports in all specialties and from all countries.

Awards
The annual Ellison-Cliffe Travelling Fellowship of £15,000 is open to Fellows of the Royal Society of Medicine working in the UK or Ireland who are of specialist registrar or lecturer grade or equivalent or who are consultants within 3 years of their first consultant appointment. The prize covers expenses for travel abroad in pursuit of further study, research or clinical training relevant to the applicant's current interests. The History of Medicine Society's prestigious Norah Schuster prize is awarded annually to an essay in the history of medicine.

The Society's Gold Medal is awarded for outstanding contribution to medicine. Past recipients have included Wilfred Trotter (1938), Sir Alexander Fleming (1947), Lord Florey (1947), Sir Martin John Evans (2009), Lord Walton of Detchant (2014), Sir Michael Marmot (2017) and more recently Dame Sarah Gilbert (2021).

The Edward Jenner Medal was originally established in 1896 by the Epidemiological Society of London (1850–1907) to commemorate the centenary of Edward Jenner's discovery of a means of smallpox vaccination. It is awarded periodically by the RSM to individuals who have undertaken distinguished work in epidemiological research.

The Society hosts the annual Ellison-Cliffe Lecture concerning the advancement of medicine, along with the associated award of a medal. Past presenters/recipients include Sir Walter Bodmer, Lord George Porter, Sir Colin Blakemore and Kevin Warwick.

Library
The RSM is home to one of the largest medical libraries in Europe. It is open to members of the public, who can visit its exhibitions and become temporary members to make use of its reference facilities. The Library represents one of the largest postgraduate biomedical collections in Europe and contains around 600,000 volumes. This includes William Harvey's Exercitatio anatomica de motu cordis et sanguinisin animalbus. Due to its historical Library holdings, the Royal Society of Medicine is a member of The London Museums of Health & Medicine group.

References

External links

 

 
1805 establishments in the United Kingdom
Buildings and structures in the City of Westminster
Health in the City of Westminster
Libraries in the City of Westminster
Medical associations based in the United Kingdom
Organisations based in the City of Westminster
Organisations based in London with royal patronage
Organizations established in 1805
Medical museums in London